ʿEnanishoʿ (Syriac: ܥܢܢܝܫܘܥ, also romanized ʿAnanishoʿ or ʿNānišoʿ) was a monk, philosopher, lexicographer and translator of the Church of the East who flourished in the 7th century.

Biography
ʿEnanishoʿ was from the region of Adiabene. He and his brother Ishoʿyahb studied at the school of Nisibis at the same time as the future patriarch Ishoʿyahb III (). His brother went on to become bishop of Shenna, while he entered the monastery of Mar Abraham on Mount Izla. He later made a pilgrimage to the Holy Land and the monasteries of Scetis in Egypt, becoming well acquainted with Greek literature and Egyptian monasticism. Upon his return he joined the monastery of Beth ʿAbe.

Writings
At Beth ʿAbe, ʿEnanishoʿ took up writing. He wrote a philosophical treatise on "definitions and divisions" and a glossary of difficult words to aid in reading the Church Fathers. He wrote Book of Rules for Homographs about Syriac homographs, words having the same spelling (i.e., consonants) but different pronunciation (i.e., vowels) and meaning. He collaborated with Ishoʿyahb III to revise the Ḥudrā, a liturgical book containing the hymns for Sunday services in the East Syriac rite. Ishoʿyahb's successor, Giwargis I (), then commissioned him to compile the Paradise of the Fathers, a collection of Syriac translations of Greek works. This major compilation comprises four books: the Lausiac History of Palladius of Helenopolis, another work of history attributed to Palladius, the History of the Monks in Egypt attributed to Jerome and a collection of sayings of the Desert Fathers.

The sayings as compiled by ʿEnanishoʿ in Syriac are known under the title Paradise of the Fathers. The Paradise contains some original material based on ʿEnanishoʿ's visit to Scetis. It is divided into fifteen chapters, with the first fourteen arranged topically and the last an unsystematic grouping. It had a major influence on East Syriac monasticism. A commentary on it was written before the end of the century by Dadīshōʿ Ḳaṭrāya. The Book of the Little Paradise of David, Bishop of the Kurds, was probably intended as a companion piece covering the native holy men of Mesopotamia. According to Thomas of Marga, a copy was kept in every monastery in the Church of the East.

Notes

References

Bibliography
Editions and translations

Secondary literature

7th-century Christian monks
Church of the East writers
Syriac Christians
Syriac writers